William Hayes (1871–1940) was a Victorian photographer in York

He moved to the small village of Hutton-le-Hole in the North York Moors in 1911, and his studio is now erected there in the Ryedale Folk Museum. (The museum is an open-air museum with other re-erected North Yorkshire buildings.)  The Hayes photographs include some of the family in the studio, which was built of corrugated aluminium with large glass windows.  Many other photographs are of farm workers around Hutton-le-Hole.

Gallery

References

External links
 His photos in York City Archives 

19th-century English photographers
1871 births
1940 deaths
Photographers from Yorkshire
People from Ryedale (district)